Sarah McIntyre is a British-American illustrator and writer of children's books and comics. She graduated in 1999 from Bryn Mawr College with a degree in Russian and a minor degree in History of Art and earned her Master's Degree in Illustration at Camberwell College of Arts in 2007. She works from a studio in Deptford, South London.

McIntyre was awarded the Sheffield Children's Book award for Best Picture Book and Overall Winner for her illustrations in the book Morris the Mankiest Monster in 2010, which also won the Bishop's Stortford Picture Book Award 2010. Her book Oliver and the Seawigs with Philip Reeve won the UKLA Book Award in 2015 in the age 7–11 category 
and their Pugs of the Frozen North won the Independent Bookshop Week Book Award in 2016. She also won the Leeds Graphic Novel Award 2011 for Vern and Lettuce, which ran originally as a weekly comic strip in The DFC and in The Guardian newspaper. Her comic strip Shark & Unicorn ran for three years in The Funday Times section of The Sunday Times newspaper.

Her projects include designing Monsterville at Discover Children's Story Centre in Stratford, London and participation in its online StoryCloud project. She curated The Comics Big-Top of Awesome at the 2012 Pop Up Festival in London.
In 2015 she began spearheading the #Pictures Mean Business campaign, demanding greater prominence and credit for book illustrators. For her campaign efforts, The Bookseller magazine listed her as one of their 2016 Rising Stars.
She is represented by Jodie Hodges at United Agents in London.

Books

Solo picture books 
 Don't Call me Grumpycorn (2020) UK: Scholastic UK
 Grumpycorn (2019) UK: Scholastic UK
 Dinosaur Firefighters (2018) UK: Scholastic UK
  The New Neighbours (2018) UK: David Fickling Books
 Dinosaur Police (2015) UK: Scholastic UK
 There's a Shark in the Bath (2014) UK: Scholastic UK

Reeve & McIntyre books 
 Kevin vs the Unicorns Roly-Poly Flying Pony Book 4 with Philip Reeve (2021) UK: Oxford University Press
 Kevin and the Biscuit Bandit Roly-Poly Flying Pony Book 3 with Philip Reeve (2020) UK: Oxford University Press
 Kevin's Great Escape Roly-Poly Flying Pony Book 2 with Philip Reeve (2019) UK: Oxford University Press
 The Legend of Kevin Roly-Poly Flying Pony Book 1 with Philip Reeve (2018) UK: Oxford University Press
 Pug-a-Doodle-Do! with Philip Reeve (2017) UK: Oxford University Press
 Jinks & O'Hare Funfair Repair with Philip Reeve (2016) UK: Oxford University Press
 Pugs of the Frozen North with Philip Reeve (2015) UK: Oxford University Press
 Cakes in Space with Philip Reeve (2014) UK: Oxford University Press
 Oliver and the Seawigs with Philip Reeve (2013) UK: Oxford University Press

Comic books 
 24 by 7 (contributor) comics anthology (2014) UK: LICAF Books
 Nelson (contributor) Graphic Novel (2011) UK: Blank Slate Books
  Vern and Lettuce (2010) UK: David Fickling Books

Picture book collaborations 
  The Faber Book of Bedtime Stories  (illustrator) with Claire Barker, Ayesha Braganza, Lucy Farfort, Kieran Larwood, Rashmi Sirdeshpande, Ingrid Persaud, Emma Carroll, Ann Jungman, Reba Khatun, Lou Kuenzler, Michael Mann, Kate Saunders, Natasha Farrant, Aisha Bushby, Pip Jones, Martyn Ford, Hannah Lee (2022) UK: Faber Childrens
  The Prince of Pants  with Alan MacDonald (2016) UK: Scholastic UK
 Jampires with David O'Connell (2014) UK: David Fickling Books
 Superkid with Claire Freeman (2013) UK: Scholastic UK
  You Can't Scare a Princess!  with Gillian Rogerson (2011) UK: Scholastic UK
  You Can't Eat a Princess! with Gillian Rogerson (2010) UK: Scholastic UK
  When Titus Took the Train  with Anne Cottringer (2010) UK: Oxford University Press
  Morris the Mankiest Monster (2009) UK: David Fickling Books with Giles Andreae
 Adventures of Riley: Mission to Madagascar with Laura Hurwitz and Amanda Lumry (2005) USA: Scholastic Inc
 Adventures of Riley: Dolphins in Danger with Laura Hurwitz and Amanda Lumry (2005) USA: Scholastic Inc
 Adventures of Riley: Amazon River Rescuewith Laura Hurwitz and Amanda Lumry (2004) USA: Scholastic Inc
 Adventures of Riley: Safari in South Africa with Laura Hurwitz and Amanda Lumry (2003) USA: Scholastic Inc
 Adventures of Riley: Tigers in Terai with Laura Hurwitz and Amanda Lumry (2003) USA: Scholastic Inc
 Adventures of Riley: Quest for Treasure in the Cayman Islands with Laura Hurwitz and Amanda Lumry (2001) USA: Eaglemont Press
 Alistair on Safari: Adventure at an African Game Reserve with Laura Hurwitz and Amanda Lumry (2000)  USA: Eaglemont Press

References

External links

 
 Blog
 McIntyre at United Agents
 McIntyre at publisher Oxford University Press
  

1975 births
Living people
American children's book illustrators
British children's book illustrators
American children's writers
British children's writers
British female comics artists
Date of birth missing (living people)